Matic Reja (born 21 September 1995) is a Slovenian footballer who plays for Jadran Dekani.

References

External links
NZS profile 
UEFA profile
National team profile 

1995 births
Living people
People from Izola
Slovenian footballers
Association football fullbacks
FC Koper players
Slovenian PrvaLiga players
NK Ankaran players
Slovenia youth international footballers